Princess Irene Galitzine (22 July 1916 – 20 October 2006) was a Russian-Georgian fashion designer whose best known creation was the palazzo pyjama.

Early life

Princess Irene Galitzine was born in 1916 in Tiflis, Russia Empire (now Tbilisi, Georgia), to Prince Boris Galitzine (1878–1958), an official of the imperial guard who belonged to the aristocratic Galitzine family, whose origins date back to 1200 and a Georgian mother, Princess Nina Lazareff (Lazarashvili, 1888–1957). However, her family were forced to flee the country following the 1917 October Revolution, and took up residence in Italy.

Career 
After studying art in Rome, English at Cambridge and French at the Sorbonne, Galitzine joined the Italian designers Sorelle Fontana in 1943 and worked with them for 3 years.

In 1946, she opened her own salon and presented her first collection. In 1960, she achieved great success with the launch of her palazzo pyjamas which were wide legged evening trousers made of soft silk. Evening pyjamas became a firm fixture of the fashion scene during the 1960s. Currently, some of her original palazzo pyjama collection still exist in notable museums around the world including the Metropolitan Museum of Art in New York, the Victoria and Albert Museum in London and the Costume Museum in St. Petersburg, Russia.

In 1962, she was named Designer of the Year by the Italian fashion press. In 1965, she won the British Sunday Times International Fashion Award and was named to the International Best Dressed List Hall of Fame. Since then, her creations have been worn by some of the most famous women in the world such as Sofia Loren, Elizabeth Taylor, Lee Radziwill, Jacqueline Kennedy Onassis, Princess Ira von Fürstenberg, Queen Paola of Belgium, Queen Anne-Marie of Greece, Marie-Hélène de Rothschild, Duchess of Windsor, Soraya Esfandiary-Bakhtiari, Merle Oberon, Audrey Hepburn, Hope Portocarrero, Marella Agnelli, Greta Garbo, Catherine Spaak, Pamela Churchill Harriman and Claudia Cardinale.

In 1990, the Galitzine label was purchased by the Xines Company. She was subsequently sentenced to six months in jail for tax evasion.

In September 1996, Galitizine opened her first boutique in Moscow, and in November of the same year she published her biography entitled From Russia to Russia.

Personal life 
Irene Galitzine was married in 1949 to Silvio Medici de Menezes, an aristocrat from Portugal. On 20 October 2006, she died at her home in Rome, aged 90.

She is buried in the Protestant Cemetery, Rome.

References

Books 
 Княжна Голицына – принцесса моды / Редакторы-составители Е.А. Скаммакка дель Мурго, М. Г. Талалай. — М.: ООО «Старая Басманная», 2019. – 212 с., XXXII с. ил. —

External links

 Site of Princess Irene Galitzine
 Biography of Irene Galitzine
 
 

1916 births
2006 deaths
Italian people of Georgian descent
University of Paris alumni
Businesspeople from Tbilisi
Fashion designers from Rome
Italian fashion designers
Italian women fashion designers
Russian women fashion designers
Alumni of the University of Cambridge
Irene
Italian expatriates in France
Italian expatriates in the United Kingdom
Soviet emigrants to Italy
Russian princesses